Pearl River Delta International Airport (PRDIA), also known as New Guangzhou International Airport or New Foshan International Airport, is a planned airport scheduled to be located in Genghe town, Gaoming District, Foshan, Guangdong Province, China.

The construction work of the airport will be started in 2022. It will operate as another airport for Guangzhou and Foshan with the existing Guangzhou Baiyun International Airport continuing to operate.

It will be another major transportation hub in mid-western part of Pearl River Delta. Situated in Genghe town, Gaoming District, Foshan, the new airport will also play a role in the transportation of the neighboring cities of Guangzhou, Zhaoqing, Yunfu and Jiangmen.

It will replace the Foshan Shadi Airport in Nanhai District.

Ground transportation
The planned Guangzhou–Zhanjiang high-speed railway will have an intermediate stop at the airport.

References 

Airports in Guangdong
Proposed airports in China